Breweries in Hawaii produce a wide range of beers in different styles that are marketed locally, regionally, and nationally. 

In 2012, Hawaii's 11 breweries and brewpubs employed 180 people directly, and more than 5,500 others in related jobs such as wholesaling and retailing. Including people directly employed in brewing, as well as those who supply Hawaii's breweries with everything from ingredients to machinery, the total business and personal tax revenue generated by Hawaii's breweries and related industries was more than $128 million. Consumer purchases of Hawaii's brewery products generated almost $65 million extra in tax revenue. In 2012, according to the Brewers Association, Hawaii ranked 27th in the number of craft breweries per capita with 10.

For context, at the end of 2013, 2,822 breweries were in the United States, including 2,768 craft breweries subdivided into 1,237 brewpubs, 1,412 microbreweries, and 119 regional craft breweries.  In that same year, according to the Beer Institute, the brewing industry employed around 43,000 Americans in brewing and distribution and had a combined economic impact of more than $246 billion.

Breweries

Defunct breweries:
 Hoku Brewing Company – Honolulu

See also 
 Beer in the United States
 List of breweries in the United States
 List of microbreweries

References

Hawaii
Breweries